Kazakhstan–Pakistan relations refer to the bilateral relations between the Republic of Kazakhstan and the Islamic Republic of Pakistan. Pakistan was among the first few countries which recognized Kazakhstan when it attained independence in December 1991. Diplomatic relations between the two countries were established in 1992 during an official visit by Kazakh President Nursultan Nazarbayev to Pakistan. Pakistan and Kazakhstan enjoy cordial relations based on a common approach towards world issues as well as mutual understanding, Islamic brotherhood and goodwill for each other.

In 2015, President Nursultan Nazarbayev himself stated that "I will never forget that Pakistan is one of the first countries to support our independence movement." As Kazakhstan is a landlocked country, Pakistan provides natural land routes and connectivity to the Eurasian heartland with the Arabian Sea and South Asia. Kazakhstan is an emerging market for Pakistani goods. Both countries have more than 35 MOUs in different fields.

Country Comparison

History
Today's region of Pakistan and Kazakhstan had links since ancient times. Both Kazakhstan and Pakistan were interconnected via ancient silk routes. Due to historic ties, Central Asia including Kazakhstan has a great influence on modern-day Pakistan. During 1920–39, many Kazakhs being compelled by Soviet atrocities, had migrated to India. In response, the Central Council of the AIML, the highest decision-making organ of the party, in its meeting under the leadership of Muhammad Ali Jinnah (founder of Pakistan), adopted a resolution on February 23, 1942, at Delhi, in which the party expressed a deep extreme concern and worry about conditions of the Kazakh migrants, and demanded the then government to do proper arrangements and provisions for Kazakhs. Consequently, they were settled peacefully in the North Western parts of India (the northern areas of current Pakistan).

Pakistan was among the first countries to recognize Kazakhstan. The diplomatic relations between the modern states of Pakistan and Kazakhstan were further tightened since the visit of Nursultan Nazarbayev of Islamabad in 1992 during which he signed the many important documents that established the legal basis for the development of bilateral relations. Pakistan and Kazakhstan also share the same time zone.

Diplomacy 

Of Pakistan
 Astana (embassy)

Of Kazakhstan
 Islamabad (embassy)

Pakistani Ambassadors to Kazakhstan  
Embassy since 1992
Riaz Muhammad Khan, Mr. Riaz Muhammad Khan 1992-1995
Sultan Hayat Khan, Mr. Sultan Hayat Khan 1995-1999
Rashid Ahmed, Mr. Rasheed Ahmed 1999-2000
 Durray Shahwar Qureshi, Ms. Durray Shahwar Kureshi 2001-2005
 Irfanur Rehman Raja, Mr. Irfan ur Rehman Raja 2005-2010
AkhtarTufail, Mr. Akhtar Tufail 2010-2013
 Shaukat Ali Mukadam, Shaukat Ali Mukadam 2013 - 2014
 Abdul Salik Khan, Mr. Abdul Salik Khan February 2015 - July 2018
 Imtiaz Ahmad Qazi, Dr. Imtiaz Ahmad Kazi 2018 - 2020
Sajjad Ahmed Sihar, Mr. Sajjad Ahmed Seehar 2020 - up to now

References

External links
Embassy of Kazakhstan to Pakistan

 
Pakistan
Bilateral relations of Pakistan